The 2004/05 FIS Ski Jumping Continental Cup was the 14th in a row (12th official) Continental Cup winter season and the 3rd summer season in ski jumping for men. This was also the 1st winter season for ladies and for the first time ladies team event was organized this season. 

Other competitive circuits this season included the World Cup and Grand Prix.

Men

Summer

Winter

Ladies

Winter

Team winter

Men's standings

Summer

Winter

Ladies' standings

Winter

Europa Cup vs. Continental Cup 
This was originally last Europa Cup season and is also recognized as the first Continental Cup season by International Ski Federation although under this name began its first official season in 1993/94.

References

FIS Ski Jumping Continental Cup
2004 in ski jumping
2005 in ski jumping